Leptinopterus is a genus of beetles belonging to the family Lucanidae.

List of species
 Leptinopterus affinis Parry, 1872
 Leptinopterus asketus Grossi, 2009
 Leptinopterus assimilis Grossi, 2009
 Leptinopterus atramentarius Nagel, 1928
 Leptinopterus bicolor Lüderwaldt, 1931
 Leptinopterus burmeisteri Arrow, 1943
 Leptinopterus consimilis Möllenkamp, 1900
 Leptinopterus constricticollis Heller, 1924
 Leptinopterus elegans Jakowleff, 1900
 Leptinopterus erythrocnemus (Burmeister, 1847)
 Leptinopterus femoratus (Olivier, 1789)
 Leptinopterus fraternus Westwood, 1874
 Leptinopterus fryi (Parry, 1862)
 Leptinopterus gracilipes Didier, 1928
 Leptinopterus gracilis Boileau, 1899
 Leptinopterus ibex (Billberg, 1820)
 Leptinopterus inaharaiLacroix, 1982
 Leptinopterus luederwaldti de Moraes in Lüderwaldt, 1935
 Leptinopterus mazama Kreische, 1926
 Leptinopterus melanarius (Hope in Westwood, 1845)
 Leptinopterus nigrotibialis Lüderwaldt, 1935
 Leptinopterus nitidus Lüderwaldt, 1930
 Leptinopterus paranensis Parry, 1872
 Leptinopterus pellitomarginatus Lüderwaldt, 1930
 Leptinopterus puncticollis Lüderwaldt, 1930
 Leptinopterus robustus Lüderwaldt, 1930
 Leptinopterus rotundicollis Lüderwaldt, 1930
 Leptinopterus suturalis Lüderwaldt, 1930
 Leptinopterus tibialis (Eschscholtz, 1822)
 Leptinopterus v-nigrum (Hope in Westwood, 1845)
 Leptinopterus vestitus Benesh, 1937
 Leptinopterus ypirangensis Lüderwaldt, 1930

References 

 Biolib

 
Lucanidae genera